Andrea Piros (born 22 January 1966) is a Swiss fencer. She competed in women's individual foil event at the 1988 Summer Olympics.

References

External links
 

1966 births
Living people
Swiss female foil fencers
Olympic fencers of Switzerland
Fencers at the 1988 Summer Olympics